The Mexico national under-21 football team represents Mexico in association football at the under-21 age level, and is controlled by the Mexican Football Federation (FMF), the governing body of football in Mexico.

The Mexico national Under-21 football team serves as a transition for players between the Mexico national under-20 football team and the Mexico national under-23 football team.

Though the team does not compete in a World Cups, It competes in international tournaments and holds several domestic training camps throughout the year.

Results and fixtures

The following matches have been played within the past 12 months.

2022

Players

Current squad
The following 22 players were called up for the 2022 Maurice Revello Tournament.

Honours
Toulon Tournament
Runners-up (1): 2018
Third place (1): 2022

See also
 Mexico national football team
 Mexico national under-23 football team
 Mexico national under-20 football team
 Mexico national under-18 football team
 Mexico national under-17 football team
 Mexico national under-15 football team
 Mexico women's national football team
 Mexico national beach football team
 Mexico national futsal team

References

Football